"Kidney Bingos" is a single by English post punk band Wire. It was released 1988 and is taken from the album A Bell Is A Cup.

Track listing

Personnel 

 Production

 Paul Davis – engineer
 Simon Hardiman – engineer
 David Heilmann – engineer
 Gareth Jones – engineer

References

External links 

 

1988 EPs
Wire (band) EPs
Albums produced by Gareth Jones (music producer)
Mute Records EPs